Montelanico is a  (municipality) in the Metropolitan City of Rome in the Italian region of Latium, located about  southeast of Rome.

Montelanico is home to an annual international short films festival, titled  ("The short [film]s arrive").

Twin towns
 Lagnes, France

References

Cities and towns in Lazio